Newton house near Brecon in Powys is an important Grade I listed 16th Century house which retains much of its original features including a screen, plasterwork, carvings and inscriptions.

The house is built near the banks of the river Usk and is reached today via the Brecon Golf club. The current house was likely finished in 1582 as the seat of the Games (Gam) family of Breconshire, though the family were referred to by the epithet “of Newton” earlier, around 1545. This suggests that a house existed on the sight before the one that exists today which was rebuilt by John Games II in 1582. The house served as the seat of the Games family until the 1690s when it was inherited by the walker family, who extensively modernised it but sold it in 1725 to the Davies family. The house was in a state of neglect by 1851, and was severally rented out from 1880 to 2000, though it is still owned by the Davies today.

History 
The land on which the house is built was first purchased by Einion Sais, the great-great-grandfather of Dafydd Gam, the first of his family to adopt the name Gam, meaning one-eyed or cross-eyed, following his distinguished service under King Edward III during the Hundred-Years-War; Sais would fight in the famous battles of Crecy (1346) and Poitiers (1356). Dafydd Gam himself remains a controversial figure in Wales, for his opposition to the Glyndwr uprising as he was a vocal ally to King Henry V. Dafydd would die at the battle of Agincourt (1415), and allegedly received his knighthood from the king as he was dying on the battlefield. Some historians also consider him to be the inspiration for Shakespears Fluellen in the play Henry V. It would be his descendants who would rebuild Newton house in 1582, and they remained an influential family until the close of the 17th century. John Games I was the MP for Powys in 1545 (when he was referred to as “of Newton”), his son Edward Games was MP for Brecon in 1542 and 45. John Games II similarly held government office, being sheriff of the county 3 times, and it was him that would rebuild the Newton house, carving an elaborate genealogy into the fireplace lintel, that traced his lineage back to Dafydd Gam.

The house passed, through marriage, to Thomas Walker at the end of the 17th century, whereupon it underwent significant modernisation. The new staircases were fitted for instance, and the current pyramidal roof was added. Walker similarly rebuilt the outbuildings and the farm, and acquired a number of notable paintings for the house. The Walkers sold Newton house in 1725, as a result of a familial marriage, to reverend Thomas Davies and his nephew Richard, whose descendants still own the mannor. Nevertheless, the house had started to fall into disrepair by the mid 19th century and was rented out between 1880 and 2000, mainly to members of the Evans family.

Architecture 
The house is a large, southward facing square-plan structure, three storeys tall with additional attic levels. The house has a pyramidal roof topped by a group of six large chimney stacks which was a later modification. The main interior feature is the great hall, a double height chamber to the south of the building, reached from the entrance hall. The great hall is a stone-flagged room with a raised dais and the large fireplace on the northern wall, the lintel of which bears the Games family crest above a genealogy connecting John Games to Dafydd Gam. Newton House is a Grade I listed building. An associated barn and range of agricultural outbuildings are both listed at Grade II.

References 

Grade I listed buildings in Powys
Elizabethan architecture